Steve Verelst (born 9 February 1987) is a Belgian football player who plays in the defensive midfield. He currently plays for Union Royale Namur on loan from R. Charleroi S.C. He previously played for Charleroi in the Belgian First Division.

References

R. Charleroi S.C. players
Union Royale Namur Fosses-La-Ville players
1987 births
Belgian footballers
Association football midfielders
Living people